The Dicta Boelcke is a list of fundamental aerial maneuvers of aerial combat formulated by First World War German flying ace Oswald Boelcke. Equipped with one of the first fighter aircraft, Boelcke became Germany's foremost flying ace during 1915 and 1916. Because of his success in aerial combat and analytic mind, he was tasked by Colonel Hermann von der Lieth-Thomsen with writing a pamphlet on aerial tactics. Completed in June 1916, it was distributed throughout the German Army's Air Service (Die Fliegertruppen des Deutschen Reiches), some two years before the French and British militaries followed suit with their own tactical guides. Air combat tactical manuals based on the Dicta Boelcke have become more elaborate over time, and have become a mainstay for NATO's air combat training of American, German, Dutch, Norwegian, Turkish, Italian, and Greek fighter pilots.

The author

Oswald Boelcke was one of the first German pilots successful in air-to-air combat. During mid-May 1915, he began to fly one of the original fighter aircraft equipped with a synchronized gun. As he began to shoot down opposing French and British airplanes, he became one of the first German fighter aces. Often flying with Max Immelmann, Boelcke gained experience in the new realm of aerial combat as he discovered the utility of having a wingman, of massing fighter planes for increased fighting power, and of flying loose formations allowing individual pilots tactical independence. Based on his successful combat experiences, he used his training as a professional soldier and his powers as an analytic thinker to design tactics for the use of aircraft in battle.

During this period of pioneering aerial warfare, the British Royal Flying Corps air effort could be summed up by "Attack everything". The French Aeronautique Militaire was concentrating its efforts on building up its bomber force. Boelcke tried to interest Immelmann in devising a tactical doctrine for fighters, to no avail. In mid-1916, Boelcke codified his tactics in the Dicta Boelcke, which was the world's first tactical manual for an air force.

During early 1916, Boelcke wrote a brochure entitled "Experiences of Air Fighting", giving tips for attacking any one of three types of opposing aircraft. This was not unique; a few other fliers in the war were sharing such combat tips with one another on a personal level.

After Immelmann's death, Boelcke was withdrawn from combat on 27 June 1916, while he was the war's leading ace, and assigned to Fliegertruppe (Flying Troops) headquarters. His reassignment was in line with the German military doctrine of Auftragstaktik, or order tactics: The belief that the junior officer on the battlefield best knows the tactics needed there. As part of his staff duties revamping the Fliegertruppe into the Luftstreitkräfte (Air Force) in early October 1916, Boelcke wrote the Dicta, which was then distributed throughout the Luftstreitkräfte as the world's first tactical manual. It was two years before the British and French followed suit in 1918. Spurred by the example of the Dicta, many of the world's military air forces would eventually develop their own tactical manuals, codified as tactics, techniques, and procedures.

The Dicta Boelcke
According to Boelcke's first biographer, Professor Johannes von Werner, the eight dicta were written for Colonel Hermann von der Lieth-Thomsen.

There are various versions of the Dicta. One version that varies somewhat from the above:

Still another version can be found online.

If followed assiduously, the Dicta tactics often led to an unseen approach for a surprise attack. As historical study has shown, thus getting in the first shot in an engagement guarantees a successful attack over 80% of the time.

Legacy
After writing the Dicta, Boelcke's tactics were taught in the fighter school he had suggested founding. He suggested that fighter planes be organized into squadrons. He also organized and led one of these original German fighter squadrons, Jagdstaffel 2. By the time he died in action after his 40th victory, he had thoroughly schooled his squadron in his tactics. Jasta 2 went on to be one of the two most successful German fighter squadrons during the remainder of the war, scoring 336 victories, and achieving a victory ratio that ran as high as 12 to one. Eight of its original members became aces; in all, 25 aces would serve in Jasta 2, scoring 90% of its victories. Four of its members would serve as generals during World War II. There was a steady rotation of Jasta 2's aces into commands of other squadrons; the most prominent example of this was Manfred von Richthofen, leading ace of the war and assigned to command the most successful German squadron, Jasta 11. As a result of Boelcke's tactical concepts, the Imperial German Air Service exacted an ever greater toll on Allied aircraft right up until war's end. For instance, Jasta 2 was credited with 46 victories for the month of September 1918.

When the next logical step was taken by the Germans in organizing fighter squadrons into a wing in June 1917, Richthofen was picked to lead it. Before his death on 21 April 1918, he wrote his own Dicta for wing tactics; it referred extensively to Boelcke's Dicta.

Similar to the Dicta Boelcke was Mick Mannock's Rules of Combat:

During the early days of World War II, South African ace Sailor Malan espoused his Ten Rules for Air Fighting. These rules closely followed the Dicta Boelcke; for instance, Rule 5's "Always turn and face the attack" could have been borrowed from the Dicta. Malan's Rules were distributed throughout the Royal Air Force.

The simple Dicta Boelcke manual has, over time, evolved into widespread use of tactics, techniques, and procedures manuals for air forces worldwide. The United States Joint Chiefs of Staff (JCS), the United States Navy (USN), and the United States Air Force (USAF) each have their own air tactics manuals. Under the auspices of the North Atlantic Treaty Organization (NATO), the USAF trains German, Dutch, Norwegian, Turkish, Italian, and Greek fighter pilots at Sheppard Air Force Base, using air tactics manuals descended from the Dicta Boelcke.

References

Footnotes

Citations

Bibliography
 
 
 
 
  Havertown, PA: Casemate (2009), first edition (1985). .

Aviation in World War I
Aerial warfare tactics
Aerial maneuvers
Imperial German Army Air Service